This is a list of television programs currently broadcast (in first-run or reruns), scheduled to be broadcast or formerly broadcast on SIC.

Current programming

Original programming

News and information
Primeiro Jornal (1992 – present)
Jornal da Noite (1993 – present)
Edição da Manhã (2008 – present)
Jornal Síntese (also known as SIC Notícias) (2008 – present)

Telenovelas
Mar Salgado (September 15, 2014 – present)

Talent shows
Factor X (October 6, 2013 – present)

Talk shows
Sextas Mágicas (2013 – present)
A Vida nas Cartas - O Dilema (2013 – present)
Portugal em Festa (August 2013 – present)
Querida Manhãs (February 3, 2014 – present)
Grande Tarde (October 6, 2014 – present)

Annual events
Golden Globes (1995 – present)

Others
Cartaz Cultural (2005 – present)
Etnias (2006 – present)
Episódio Especial (February 23, 2008 – present)
Fama Show (March 2, 2008 – present)
Alta Definição (2009 – present)
Totoloto (2011 – present)

Kids
Disney Kids (2001 – present) (block with Disney Channel/Disney XD shows)
LOL@SIC (2011 – present) (block with kids shows)

Acquired programming

Telenovelas
Amor à Vida (September 2, 2013 – present)
Senhora do Destino (October 7, 2013 – present)
Em Família (March 31, 2014 – present)
Lado a Lado (September 8, 2014 – present)
Império (October 13, 2014 – present)

TV shows/sitcoms
The Blacklist (October 12, 2013 – present)
Criminal Minds (2014 – present)

Documentaries
BBC Vida Selvagem (1995 – present)

Kids
Mako Mermaids (2013 – present)
Yu-Gi-Oh! 5D's (2014 – present) (part of LOL@SIC)
Lego Ninjago (2014 – present) (part of LOL@SIC)
Pac-Man and the Ghostly Adventures (2014 – present) (part of LOL@SIC)
Sam Fox: Extreme Adventures (2014 – present)

Sociedade Independente de Comunicação original programming